Georgia Peach or Georgia Peaches may refer to:

 Peaches grown in the U.S. state of Georgia
 Georgia Peach (album), an album by Burrito Deluxe
 GA Peach a 2006 album by female rap artist Rasheeda
 "Georgia Peaches", a 2011 song recorded by Lauren Alaina
 The Georgia Peaches, a 1980 film
 American Major League Baseball outfielder Ty Cobb was nicknamed "The Georgia Peach"
 "The Georgia Peach", the name given by the Germans to Jane Anderson, an American broadcaster of Nazi propaganda during World War II
 American gospel singer Sister Clara Hudmon used the stage name "Georgia Peach"
 Peach County, Georgia